|}

The Summer Stakes is a Group 3 flat horse race in Great Britain open to fillies and mares aged three years or older. It is run at York over a distance of 6 furlongs (1,207 metres), and it is scheduled to take place each year in July.

The event was established in 1996, and it was initially classed at Listed level. It was promoted to Group 3 status in 2003.

The Summer Stakes is held on the opening day of York's two-day John Smith's Cup meeting.

Records
Most successful horse (3 wins):
 Ladies are Forever - 2011, 2013, 2014

Leading jockey (2 wins):
 Stephen Carson – Palace Affair (2001, 2002)
 Paul Hanagan - Rose Blossom (2010), Royal Intervention (2019)
 Silvestre De Sousa - Ladies are Forever (2011), Flotus (2022) 

Leading trainer (3 wins):
 Geoff Oldroyd - Ladies are Forever (2011, 2013, 2014)

Winners

See also
 Horse racing in Great Britain
 List of British flat horse races

References
 Racing Post:

 galopp-sieger.de – Summer Stakes.
 ifhaonline.org – International Federation of Horseracing Authorities – Summer Stakes (2019).
 pedigreequery.com – Summer Stakes – York.

Flat races in Great Britain
York Racecourse
Sprint category horse races for fillies and mares
Recurring sporting events established in 1996
1996 establishments in England